Ryongch'ŏn County is a kun (county) in North P'yǒngan province, North Korea, at the mouth of the Yalu River. The area has a reported population of 27,000 and is a centre of chemical and metalworking production.

Administrative divisions
Ryongch'ŏn county is divided into 1 ŭp (town), 3 rodongjagu (workers' districts) and 19 ri (villages):

Transport
The P'yŏngŭi line of the Korean State Railway, running between China and P'yŏngyang runs through Ryongchŏn and is served by several stations, including in Ryongch'ŏn-ŭp. It is the busiest line in the country, crossing the border in nearby Sinŭiju, North Korea to Dandong, China.

Ryongch'ŏn disaster
On 22 April 2004, the town suffered a major disaster when a flammable cargo exploded at the town's railway station, causing many deaths and much destruction, known as the Ryongch'ŏn disaster.

Protests
In February 2011, the area and others in North P'yŏngan had rare protests, of a few score of people, calling for adequate provision of rice and power. At the time, news of the Arab Spring was spreading via Chinese TV channels and phone calls with defectors.

See also
Geography of North Korea

References

External links
View disaster satellite images on Google Earth 
KoreaTimes article about the incident 
Timeline showing events in Ryongchon

 
Counties of North Pyongan